The 2022–23 Rutgers Scarlet Knights men's basketball team represented Rutgers University–New Brunswick during the 2022–23 NCAA Division I men's basketball season. The Scarlet Knights weree led by seventh-year head coach Steve Pikiell and played their home games at Jersey Mike's Arena in Piscataway, New Jersey as members of the Big Ten Conference.

Previous season
The Knights finished the 2020–21 season 18–14, 12–8 in Big Ten play to finish a three-way tie for fourth place. As the No. 4 seed in the Big Ten tournament, they lost in the quarterfinals to Iowa. The Knights received an at-large bid to the NCAA tournament for the second consecutive year as a No. 11 seed in the West region. There they lost in the First Four to Notre Dame in double overtime.

Offseason

Departures

Incoming transfers

Recruiting classes

2022 recruiting class

2023 recruiting class

Roster

Schedule and results

|-
!colspan=12 style=|Regular season

|-
!colspan=12 style=|Big Ten tournament

|-
!colspan=12 style=| NIT

Source

Rankings

References

Rutgers Scarlet Knights men's basketball seasons
Rutgers
Rutgers
Rutgers
Rutgers